Victor Aviat (born 1982) is a French oboist and conductor of classical music and opera.

Biography
Born in Montpellier, Aviat studied oboe, piano and conducting in Paris, Zürich (Zurich University of the Arts) and Geneva. He is an orchestra musician, works regularly as principal oboe with the Zürich Opera House, the Lucerne Festival Orchestra, the Chamber Orchestra of Europe, the Budapest Festival Orchestra, the Orchestra Mozart among others. After further study, Aviat began a career as a conductor parallel to his activities and has led performances with the Orchestre national de Lille, the Luxembourg Philharmonic Orchestra, the Royal Philharmonic Orchestra and others.

In the season 2015/16, Aviat conducted a new production of Offenbach's operetta Le roi Carotte at the Opéra de Lyon which was broadcast on radio and television and was widely praised. This production of Le roi Carotte under the musical direction of Aviat won "Best Rediscovered Work" in the International Opera Awards 2016. From 2016 to 2018 Aviat was the Bournemouth Symphony Orchestra Leverhulme Young Conductor in Association of the Bournemouth Symphony Orchestra. More recently Aviat showed interests in composition. His first orchestral piece has been performed by Orchestre National de France in December 2019.

References

External links

1982 births
Living people
Musicians from Montpellier
Zurich University of the Arts alumni
French male conductors (music)
French classical oboists
21st-century French conductors (music)
21st-century French male musicians